Turquoise Line or Blue Green Line may refer to:

 Turquoise Line (London)
 Turquoise Line (New York)
 Turquoise Line (Paris)
 Turquoise Line (Vancouver)
 Blue Green Line (Denver) or R Line in Colorado, U.S.
 Blue Green Line (Moscow)
 Blue Green Line (RTD) or W Line in Colorado, U.S.
 Line 16 (Shanghai Metro)
 Line 18 (Chongqing Rail Transit)

See also 
 Green Line (disambiguation)
 Light Blue Line (disambiguation)
 Teal Line (disambiguation)